Formentera is a song by Spanish singer Aitana and Argentine rapper and singer Nicki Nicole. It was released on December 3, 2021, as the second single from Aitana's upcoming third studio album by Universal Music Spain.

Background 
During an interview with Los 40 in November 2021, Nicki Nicole confirmed that she had collaborated with Aitana in a track that would be released soon. Some days later, Aitana confirmed the release date of the single and confirmed that the music video would also be dropping that same day.

Reception 
"The catchy melody of the song's chorus is one of the most memorable parts of the song". Soon after its release, the song was criticized by some listeners because one verse reads, "I'll fly directly to Formentera", but Formentera is an island and has no airport.

Commercial performance
The song debuted at number 76 on the Billboard Argentina Hot 100 and eventually peaked at number 57. In Spain, the song peaked at number three and was certified gold.

Track listing

Charts

Certifications

References 

Spanish songs
2021 songs
Aitana (singer) songs
Nicki Nicole songs
2021 singles
Songs written by Andrés Torres (producer)
Songs written by Mauricio Rengifo
Songs written by Aitana (singer)
Song recordings produced by Andrés Torres (producer)
Songs written by Nicki Nicole